Almedin Hota (born 22 July 1976 in Sarajevo) is a Bosnian retired professional footballer. He still plays amateur football and futsal, in Klagenfurt though.

International career
He made his debut for Bosnia and Herzegovina in a May 1998 friendly match away against Argentina and has earned a total of 22 caps, scoring 3 goals. His final international was an October 2002 friendly against Germany.

Career statistics

International
Source:

International goals

Honours

Player
Bosna Visoko
Bosnian Cup: 1998–99

Kärnten
Austrian Football Second League: 2000–01
Austrian Cup: 2000–01
Austrian Supercup: 2001

LASK
Austrian Football Second League: 2006–07

References

External links

1976 births
Living people
Footballers from Sarajevo
Association football midfielders
Bosnia and Herzegovina footballers
Bosnia and Herzegovina international footballers
FK Olimpik players
NK Bosna Visoko players
FK Sarajevo players
FC Kärnten players
LASK players
FC Admira Wacker Mödling players
Aluminium Hormozgan F.C. players
SK Austria Klagenfurt players
SVG Bleiburg players
Premier League of Bosnia and Herzegovina players
2. Liga (Austria) players
Austrian Football Bundesliga players
Austrian Landesliga players
Austrian Regionalliga players
Azadegan League players
Bosnia and Herzegovina expatriate footballers
Expatriate footballers in Austria
Bosnia and Herzegovina expatriate sportspeople in Austria
Expatriate footballers in Iran
Bosnia and Herzegovina expatriate sportspeople in Iran